Serine/arginine-Rich Splicing Factor (SRSF) protein kinase-1 SRPK1 is an enzyme that in humans is encoded by the SRPK1 gene.

Function 

This gene encodes a serine/arginine protein kinase specific for the SR (serine/arginine-rich domain) family of splicing factors. The protein localizes to the nucleus and the cytoplasm. It is thought to play a role in regulation of both constitutive and alternative splicing by regulating intracellular localization of splicing factors. A second alternatively spliced transcript variant for this gene has been described, but its full length nature has not been determined.

SRPK1 enables angiogenesis, which is regulated by VEGF, which either initiates or inhibits vessel formation depending on alternative splicing.

Medical applications 

Some cancers are vascular endothelial growth factor (VEGF) dependant (for angiogenesis). SRPK1 activates (phosphorylates) VEGF splicing factor. SRPK1 inhibitors (e.g. 'SPHINX compounds' ) are under investigation as treatments for prostate cancer, acute myeloid leukemia and neovascular eye disease.

Interactions 

SRPK1 has been shown to interact with:
 ASF/SF2 and
 SNRP70.
 C6orf201

References

Further reading